Rasa Mažeikytė (born 31 March 1976) is a Lithuanian cyclist. She competed at the 1996 Summer Olympics and the 2000 Summer Olympics.

References

External links
 

1976 births
Living people
Lithuanian female cyclists
Olympic cyclists of Lithuania
Cyclists at the 1996 Summer Olympics
Cyclists at the 2000 Summer Olympics
Sportspeople from Klaipėda